SC United Bantams is an American soccer team based in Columbia, South Carolina that plays in USL League Two. The team is linked with professional English team Bradford City, and was formerly known as Palmetto FC Bantams.

Players and staff

Current staff

Year-by-year

Honors
 '''USL League Two
Deep South Division Champions 2021

Stadiums
 Lander University: Jeff May Complex (Greenwood, South Carolina), 2012–
 Stone Stadium (Columbia, South Carolina), 2012–2014
 Southeastern Freight Lines Soccer Center (Columbia, South Carolina) 2018–

References

External links

Association football clubs established in 2011
USL League Two teams
Soccer clubs in South Carolina
2011 establishments in South Carolina
Sports in Columbia, South Carolina